The Indonesia Institute of the Arts, Yogyakarta (Institut Seni Indonesia Yogyakarta, ISI Yogyakarta) is a state-owned college in Bantul Regency, Special Region of Yogyakarta, Indonesia. It teaches visual, performing, and media arts in traditional Indonesian and modern international styles. ISI Yogyakarta was ranked number one in Indonesia on the QS World's Top Performing Arts Schools in 2022.

History
ISI Yogyakarta was founded on 23 July 1984, replacing ASRI Arts Academy (founded in 1950), AMI Music Academy (founded in 1952), and ASTI Dance Academy (founded in 1961). It became the largest arts institution in the nation.

Administration
The Minister of National Education directly appoints its governing board, including president, vice-presidents, and deans. The institute delegates authority to the Senate, composed of professors, faculty members, and top administrative offices, who define the institute policy as a whole, determines and supervises courses and curricula, advises the administrators on budgets, faculty appointments, and promotions.

Educational programmes
ISI Yogyakarta has three schools with 11 departments. They offer a diploma in arts, undergraduate degree (Sarjana degree) in arts, master's degree in arts creation & aesthetic interpretation and arts management and a doctorate degree in arts creation and interpretation.

ISI Yogyakarta might offer a collaborative program with the Royal Melbourne Institute of Technology, Melbourne, Australia.

Schools and departments

Undergraduate degrees
School of Visual Arts
Department of Fine Art, offers courses in painting, sculpture, and printmaking
Department of Crafts, offers courses in wooden, metal, textile, ceramic, and leather crafts, also
Diploma III in Batik and Fashion
Department of Design, offers courses in interior design, visual communication design, and product design
Department of Arts Management
School of Performing Arts
Department of Dance,  offers courses in dance performance, and choreography, modern and traditional
Department of Karawitan Music, offers courses in Javanese, Sundanese, and Balinese music performance and composition
Department of Ethnomusicology, offers courses in Nusantara archipelago folk music, Asian tribal and classical music traditions
Department of Puppetry, offers courses in the artistry of Javanese shadow puppet play 
Department of Music, offers courses in Western music performance, Western-based school music, musicology and composition
Diploma IV in Western Musics Presentation
Department of Theatre, offers courses in acting, directing, visual stage-setting, modern and traditional
Department of Dramatic and Musical Arts Education cultural arts
School of Recorded Media Arts
Department of Photography, offers courses in photographic art
Department of Television, offers courses in television programming
Diploma III in Animation

Master's degrees
Master of Arts Creation and Interpretation
Master of Arts Management

Doctorate degrees
Doctor of Arts Creation and Interpretation

Campus
It includes an administrative building, studios, academic buildings, auditoriums, pendapa, library, art gallery, the mosque, student's center, tennis court and soccer field.

Two former campuses are the former ASRI campus at Gampingan and AMI campus at Suryodiningratan. The former AMI campus at Suryodiningratan is now the campus building for master and doctorate programs.

Students
ISI Yogyakarta enrolls about 2,000 students from all over the country, mainly from Java and Sumatra. ISI Yogyakarta also welcomes overseas students who are interested in learning Indonesian traditional arts, mostly in a non-degree programs. Courses on traditional dance, karawitan, and batik are the most popular study programs for foreign students.

Alumni
 Heri Dono, artist
Luluk Purwanto, jazz violinist

References

External links
Official site
http://isi.ac.id/profil/unit-urusan-internasional

Colleges in Indonesia
Universities in the Special Region of Yogyakarta
Indonesian state universities